The Niagara Wheatfield Tribune is an American weekly newspaper serving Niagara County, New York. It was founded in 1985 by Skip Mazenauer as part of the Niagara Frontier Publications family. Considered a paper of public record for Niagara County by the Niagara County Clerk's office, it is published on Tuesdays and it has a circulation of 10,300 copies.

In 2009, the longtime bookkeeper for Niagara Frontier Publications, Jack C. Bates, was found guilty of embezzling $75,000 from Niagara Frontier Publications. The thefts, which happened over a period of ten years, caused financial distress to the company and was later discovered during an audit.

Awards and honors 
Publishers Skip and Judy Mazenauer received the 2014 Family Business Center Vision Award for their leadership in founding four newspapers for Western New York State. The press release for the award noted the important contributions of the paper to the community.

The current editor of the Niagara Wheatfield Tribune is David Yarger. In 2017, Yarger won 3rd place in the New York Press Association's Better Newspaper Contest, in the category of Rookie Reporter of the Year.

References 

Newspapers published in New York (state)
1985 establishments in New York (state)
Niagara County, New York
Newspapers established in 1985